Yanbol Synagogue is a synagogue in Istanbul, built by Sephardi Jews who moved from the Bulgarian town of Yambol to Istanbul during the 15th century. The synagogue is also known as the Bulgarian Synagogue owing to the origin of the community. The synagogue was constructed in the 18th century. However, it underwent repairs during the end of the 19th century thus the structure today is not the original. Today, the synagogue is only open for Shabbat services due to a decrease in the Jewish community in the area.

See also
 History of the Jews in Turkey
 Ahrida Synagogue of Istanbul
 List of synagogues in Turkey

References and notes

External links

 Chief Rabbinate of Turkey
 Shalom Newspaper - The main Jewish newspaper in Turkey

Bulgarians in Istanbul
Bulgarian-Jewish diaspora
Golden Horn
Fatih
Jewish Bulgarian history
Sephardi Jewish culture in Turkey
Sephardi synagogues
Synagogues in Istanbul
Synagogues in the Ottoman Empire
Yambol